Miessence is a certified organic product range from Organic and Natural Enterprises Pty Ltd (ONE Group), an organic cosmetic and beauty company from Australia. The founder of the Miessence range, Narelle Chenery first began to use organic ingredients in 1997.

The basic ingredients for Miessence products are grown, harvested and processed organically.

Miessence products are sold direct to the consumer via their website, in retail stores in Australia and New Zealand as well as some countries that have exclusive distributors. Onegroup also has an Affiliate system where registered Affiliates can receive commissions on sales they make.

Organika Ukraina Distribute Miessence products in the Ukraine and Russia.

In Scandinavia, the distribution is made from Wellness Aarhus in Denmark.

Certificates 
Australian Certified Organic

Biological farmers of Australia

United States Department of Agriculture's National Organic

References

External links 
Official website

Cosmetics companies of Australia